Olena Khomrova (born May 16, 1987 in Mykolaiv) is a Ukrainian fencer and member of the team which won the gold medal in sabre at the 2008 Summer Olympics.

Career
The Ukrainian team (she has stayed a member of) won gold in the Sabre final beating Russia during the 2009 and 2010 European Fencing Championships. At the 2009 World Fencing Championships Khomrova and her teammates beat France to win gold.

The team won the title "Team of the Year" at the (Ukrainian) "Heroes of Sports Year 2009" ceremony in April 2010.

Personal life
Olena Khomrova is married to Sergiy Gladyr, a Ukrainian basketball player. They have one daughter, Eva.

References

1987 births
Living people
Ukrainian female sabre fencers
Fencers at the 2008 Summer Olympics
Olympic fencers of Ukraine
Olympic gold medalists for Ukraine
Sportspeople from Mykolaiv
Olympic medalists in fencing
Medalists at the 2008 Summer Olympics
Universiade medalists in fencing
Universiade silver medalists for Ukraine
Medalists at the 2011 Summer Universiade
21st-century Ukrainian women